At least two ships of the Royal Norwegian Navy have been named HNoMS Bergen, after the city of Bergen:

, a  destroyer purchased from the Royal Navy in 1946 and broken up in 1967.
, an  commissioned in 1967 and decommissioned in 2005.

Royal Norwegian Navy ship names